Donald Hardy Castle (born February 1, 1950) is a former professional baseball player. He played in four games in Major League Baseball for the Texas Rangers in 1973, three as a designated hitter and one as a pinch hitter.

Castle was drafted as a first baseman in the first round in 1968 by the Washington Senators, who became the Rangers in 1972. In addition to his brief major league career, Castle played for eleven years in minor league baseball, finishing his career with the West Haven Yankees in 1978.

References

External links

1950 births
Living people
Baseball players from Indiana
Burlington Senators players
Denver Bears players
Major League Baseball designated hitters
Pittsfield Senators players
Spokane Indians players
Syracuse Chiefs players
Texas Rangers players
West Haven Yankees players
Sportspeople from Kokomo, Indiana
People from Coldwater, Mississippi